The Balsams Grand Resort Hotel is a grand hotel and ski resort located in Dixville Notch in New Hampshire, United States. The resort grounds cover  and feature  of cross-country ski trails, an alpine ski area with 16 trails, five glade areas and a terrain park. There is also a nine-hole golf course and an 18-hole championship course called "Panorama" which was designed by Donald Ross.

History

Located along the old Coös Trail (now Route 26) through Dixville Notch, it first opened just after the Civil War as the Dix House, a 25-room summer inn established by George Parsons. In 1895, it was purchased by Henry S. Hale, a Philadelphia inventor and industrialist who had been a regular guest. He renamed it "The Balsams", and over time enlarged and augmented the facilities. In 1918, Hale completed the Hampshire House, the towering wing which doubled the resort's capacity to 400 guests.

The Ballot Room of The Balsams is where Dixville Notch's presidential primary votes are cast just after midnight on the day of the New Hampshire primaries since the 1960s. These votes cast by Dixville Notch residents are among the first to be cast, counted, and reported nationally.

Current operations
The Balsams closed to the public after being purchased by new owners for $2.3 million in December 2011, and remains closed as of January 2021 as its owners continue to seek financing for their redevelopment and expansion efforts. In 2014, former American Skiing Company head Les Otten joined the Balsams redevelopment effort. Included in Otten's current plan is a massive expansion of the ski area to around 1,000 acres and the addition of multiple lifts, including a year-round gondola to the summit and a lift connection across Route 26 to the hotel complex. The expanded ski area would be quadruple its current size and be one of the largest ski areas in the Northeast. Plans also call for the renovation of the main hotel buildings, the Dix and Hampshire houses, as well as a new hotel wing, and renovations to the golf course clubhouse. The plans also call for the conversion of a portion of the existing buildings from hotel rooms to condominiums as well as the potential construction of additional condominium units.

Otten has stated that the project to redevelop the hotel and resort would cost an estimated $170 million. After years of effort by the owners of the property, New Hampshire Governor Chris Sununu signed the so-called "Balsams Bill" into law in May 2019, allowing the Coös County Commissioners to create a tax increment financing district around the Balsams. Otten seeks to sell $28 million of bonds under the municipal finance structure in order to begin the redevelopment. In 2021, Provident Resources Group, a national nonprofit, agreed to finance the construction of the new hotel. The development team later announced the addition of Goldman Sachs to advance the financing of the project. This led to a surge in real-estate interest, with over 500 pre-sale commitments totaling $30 million by June 2022.

See also

 National Register of Historic Places listings in Coos County, New Hampshire

References

External links
 Balsams Grand Resort - Official site
 Balsams Wilderness Ski Area History - NewEnglandSkiHistory.com

Buildings and structures in Coös County, New Hampshire
Hotels in New Hampshire
Defunct ski areas and resorts in New Hampshire
Golf clubs and courses in New Hampshire
Golf clubs and courses designed by Donald Ross
Hotel buildings on the National Register of Historic Places in New Hampshire
Tourist attractions in Coös County, New Hampshire
National Register of Historic Places in Coös County, New Hampshire
Event venues on the National Register of Historic Places in New Hampshire